Hula-La-La is a 1951 short subject directed by Hugh McCollum starring American slapstick comedy team The Three Stooges (Moe Howard, Larry Fine and Shemp Howard). It is the 135th entry in the series released by Columbia Pictures starring the comedians, who released 190 shorts for the studio between 1934 and 1959.

Plot
The Stooges are choreographers at B. O. Pictures who are assigned to teach island natives how to dance. The studio's president, Mr. Baines (Emil Sitka) has purchased the fictional Pacific island of Rarabonga (parody of Rarotonga, one of the Cook Islands) for his next musical extravaganza, but learns that the local natives have never heard of dancing.

When the Stooges arrive at Rarabonga, they soon learn that the natives are cannibalistic head hunters under the control of a powerful evil witch doctor named Varanu (Kenneth MacDonald) who collects Shrunken human heads. Shemp makes it clear he does not want the "hair cuts down to my neck!" and the Stooges try to flee with the help of the Tribe King's daughter Luana (Jean Willes). She wants them to rescue her boyfriend from the witch doctor, who plans to behead him in the morning—along with the Stooges. In one of the huts, the Three Stooges try to get their hands on a box of surplus World War II hand grenades guarded by a living Kali type four-armed totem idol (Lei Aloha). After getting the daylights beat out of them by the fierce idol, the boys grab the box of grenades, and fool the Witch Doctor into proving his expertise with his sword by slicing the box of grenades with his huge sword, and the grenades promptly explode, blowing him out of the atmosphere.

With Witch Doctor Varanu gone, the Stooges commence with their choreography lessons and teach the natives to dance.

Cast
 Shemp Howard as Shemp
 Larry Fine as Larry
 Moe Howard as Moe
 Jean Willes as Luana
 Kenneth MacDonald as Varanu, Witch Doctor
 Emil Sitka as Mr. Baines
 Joy Windsor as Kiwana

Production
Hula-La-La was filmed on May 25–29, 1951. It was the only Three Stooges film directed by producer Hugh McCollum, who gave the medium a shot while Edward Bernds was busy directing feature films. Bernds described McCollum's directing style as "gentle and tasteful", like McCollum himself. However, film author Ted Okuda believed this hurt his films, not allowing them to reach their full potential. Hula-La-La was cited as an example of suffering from moments of restraint, resulting in several scenes lacking their comedic punch.

The standard "Three Blind Mice" theme is replaced during the end titles with a hula composition entitled "Lu-Lu." The tune was written by Columbia Pictures composers Ross DiMaggio and Nico Grigor.

References

External links
 
 

1951 films
1951 comedy films
1951 short films
The Three Stooges films
Films set on fictional islands
American black-and-white films
Columbia Pictures short films
American comedy films
1950s English-language films
1950s American films
Films about witch doctors